The 1995 Rose Bowl was a college football bowl game played on Monday January 2, 1995, because New Year's Day was on a Sunday. It was the 81st Rose Bowl Game. The Penn State Nittany Lions defeated the Oregon Ducks 38–20. Ki-Jana Carter of Penn State and Danny O'Neil of Oregon both were named the Rose Bowl Players of the Game. Many observers point to this game as the one that made Ki-Jana Carter a number one selection in the 1995 NFL Draft.

Teams

Both teams were appearing in the Rose Bowl after being away for many years. The Oregon Ducks last appeared in the 1958 Rose Bowl, 37 years prior. The Penn State Nittany Lions appeared only one other time, the 1923 Rose Bowl, when the Rose Bowl stadium was used for the game for the first time.

Penn State Nittany Lions

Penn State was playing their second season as the 11th member in the Big Ten Conference. They went undefeated through the Big Ten season and were ranked #2 going into the contest.

Oregon Ducks

Oregon opened with a win over Portland State, but then lost to non-conference opponents Utah and Hawaii. However, on October 1, 1994, the Ducks pulled off a surprise trouncing of #19 USC, a team that the Ducks had defeated only one other time since 1972. Two weeks after defeating #19 USC the Ducks upset #9 Washington in a game that sparked a period of unprecedented success in the Oregon-Washington rivalry. They would go on to win the rest of their conference games, excepting a week 6 loss to Washington State, including a 10–9 victory over Arizona. The season ended with a 17–13 win over Oregon State with the Rose Bowl on the line. Oregon finished in sole possession of first place, with Arizona and USC tied for second.

Game summary
Penn State running back Ki-Jana Carter provided the highlight of the game when he scored an 83-yard touchdown on Penn State's first offensive play, prompting announcer Keith Jackson to utter the quote "They had him, they thought and then he was gone."  After Carter's touchdown, Oregon came right back to tie the game.  Penn State scored again and led 14–7 at halftime. But Oregon rode the short passing game of QB Danny O'Neil and kept the ball away from the potent Penn State offense. Oregon tied the game midway through the 3rd quarter.  Penn State scored to take a 21–14 and got the ball back. Then came the key play of the game. Penn State S Chuck Penzenik intercepted O'Neil with just over two minutes left in the third quarter, returning the ball to the Oregon 13-yard line. Carter then scored his third touchdown, a short 3-yard run that put the Nittany Lions ahead 28–14. Penn State went on to win in comfortable fashion, 38–20.

Scoring

First quarter
Penn State – Ki-Jana Carter 83 run (Brett Conway kick), 10:50
Oregon – Josh Wilcox 1 pass from Danny O’Neil (Matt Belden kick), 10:05

Second quarter
Penn State – Brian Milne 1 run (Conway kick), 1:26

Third quarter
Oregon – Cristin McLemore 17 pass from O’Neil (Belden kick), 4:54
Penn State – Carter 17 run (Conway kick), 3:53
Penn State – Carter 3 run (Conway kick), 2:01

Fourth quarter
Penn State – Conway 43 FG, 5:43
Penn State – Jon Witman 9 run (Michael Barninger kick), 4:24
Oregon – Ricky Whittle 3 run (pass failed), 2:44

Statistics

Game records

Aftermath
Danny O'Neil contributed to 13 Rose Bowl records including individual records for passes attempted, passes completed, and passing yardage. As of 2008, his records still stood for most offensive plays (74), most passes attempted (61), most passes completed (41) and most yards passing (456).

Ki-Jana Carter was inducted into the Rose Bowl Hall of Fame as a member of the Class of 2014.

References

Bibliography

Oregon Ducks football media guide (PDF copy available at www.goducks.com)
Kevin Gorman - Nittany Lions prove worth at 1995 Rose Bowl. Penn State Daily Collegian, October 29, 2001
Penn State Bowl history

Rose Bowl
Rose Bowl Game
Oregon Ducks football bowl games
Penn State Nittany Lions football bowl games
January 1995 sports events in the United States
Rose